Deposed Crown Princess Park of the Miryang Park clan (Hangul: 폐빈 박씨, Hanja: 廢嬪 朴氏; 1598 – June 1623) was the primary wife of Deposed Crown Prince Yi Ji, eldest son of Gwanghaegun of Joseon and Deposed Queen Yu.

Biography
On 2 August 1611 (3rd year reign of Gwanghaegun of Joseon, her future father in-law), the 13-year-old Lady Park was chosen as the Crown Princess Consort (왕세자빈, 王世子嬪) and then married with Gwanghaegun's son, Crown Prince Yi Ji. Later, in August 1614, she gave birth to their first daughter but died sometime after in the winter.

Meanwhile, on 13 March 1623, Park was deposed from her position along with her in-law's and got exiled to Ganghwa Island. Her family was exiled too and some of them were beheaded as execution. 

While in exile, the deposed couple fasted or tried to commit suicide by hanging themselves, but failed. In the end, about two months later in April (May of the lunar calendar), Yi Ji was digging a tunnel to escape. When his wife and him tried to escape the island, they were caught by the royal soldiers. The deposed crown princess committed suicide in June 1623 (lunar calendar May) the third day after her husband was arrested. She was 26 years old. Then on 22 July, a month after his late wife’s death (in Lunar calendar was 25 June), her husband died from hunger.

Park didn't receive a posthumous name because she was deposed from her position.

Family
Father: Park Ja-heung (1581 - 1623) (박자흥)
Grandfather: Park Seung-jong (1562 - 1623) (박승종)
Great-grandfather: Park Ahn-se (? - 1618) (박안세)
Great-grandmother: Lady Hwang of the Changwon Hwang clan (정경부인 창원 황씨); daughter of Hwang Rim (황림, 黃琳)
Grandmother: Lady Kim of the Andong Kim clan (정경부인 안동 김씨); daughter of Kim Sa-won (김사원, 金士元)
Mother: Lady Yi of the Gwangju Yi clan (정부인 광주 이씨)
Grandfather: Yi Yi-cheom, Internal Prince Gwangchang (1560 - 1623) (이이첨 광창부원군)
Grandmother: Lady Lee (이씨); daughter of Lee Eung-rok (이응록, 李應祿)
Husband: Deposed Crown Prince Yi Ji (31 December 1598 - 22 July 1623) (폐세자 이지)
Father-in-law: Gwanghaegun of Joseon (4 June 1575 - 7 August 1641) (조선 광해군)
Mother-in-law: Deposed Queen Yu of the Munhwa Yu clan (15 August 1576 - 31 October 1623) (폐비 유씨)
 Issue
 Unnamed daughter (군주) (August 1614 - 1614)

References

17th-century Korean people
1598 births
1623 deaths
17th-century Korean women